Rosamond Mary Monckton, MBE (born 26 October 1953) is an English business woman and charity campaigner.

Background 
Monckton is the daughter of Marianna Laetitia Bower and Gilbert Monckton, 2nd Viscount Monckton of Brenchley and was educated at the Ursuline Convent at Tildonk in Belgium. 

Monckton's elder brother is Christopher Monckton, 3rd Viscount Monckton (born 1952), journalist, public speaker, and outspoken climate change sceptic. She also has three younger brothers: twins Timothy and Jonathan (born 1955), and Anthony (born 1960).

She is married to the journalist The Hon. Dominic Lawson (son of Conservative politician Nigel Lawson and brother of the food writer Nigella Lawson). They have three daughters, Domenica, Savannah and Natalia (deceased). Domenica has Down syndrome; her godmother was Monckton's friend Diana, Princess of Wales. Monckton had a stillbirth in 1994, after which the baby was buried in a garden on the grounds of Kensington Palace with Diana's help.

Career 
Rosa Monckton served as the president of Tiffany & Co. She was later Chief Executive of Asprey & Garrard until 2002, when she became a non-executive chairman of Asprey London and Garrard & Co.

In 2017, Monckton wrote a controversial piece for The Spectator arguing for learning-disabled people to be able to work for less pay than minimum wage, citing 1.3 million unemployed people of 1.4 million people with learning disabilities in the UK. This article was criticised by members of the disability rights movement.

In 2015 it was revealed that Rosa Monckton appears in Jeffrey Epstein's contacts book, on page 39, where 9 telephone numbers and one address was recorded by Epstein.

Fundraising 
Rosa Lawson is a fundraiser and supports several charities relating to children and Down syndrome. The charities include:

 The Acorns Children's Hospice for the care of life limited children in the heart of England 
 Downside Up a Down syndrome charity in Russia
 The Down's Syndrome Educational Trust based in Portsmouth, England which through research provides education, information and training to promote the development of children with Down syndrome
 Kids (charity), a disabled children's charity based in England. KIDS helps in developing and improving the lives of disabled children
 The Bulgarian Abandoned Children's Trust, a British charity dedicated to helping disabled and disadvantaged children in Bulgaria and campaigning for an end to the use of institutional care
 Team Domenica, a charity named after her daughter which supports young adults with learning disabilities to find employment

Lawson was awarded a Member of the Order of British Empire in 2017 Birthday Honours List for voluntary and charitable services to People with Learning Disabilities and their Families in the UK and Abroad.

References

External links 

The Daily Telegraph: A helping hand for struggling parents. - Interview from 28 September 1999
The Daily Telegraph: I will talk of my daughter in English, not Newspeak - Interview from 16 May 2004

1953 births
Living people
English businesspeople
Charity fundraisers (people)
Daughters of viscounts